New York's 125th State Assembly district is one of the 150 districts in the New York State Assembly. It has been represented by Anna Kelles since 2021, succeeding Barbara Lifton.

Geography 
District 125 contains all of Tompkins County and the southwest portion of Cortland County. This includes the cities of Ithaca and Cortland. Cornell University's campus is also within this district.

Recent election results

2022

2020

2018

2016

2014

2012

References

125
Tompkins County, New York
Cortland County, New York